Pepsis albocincta is a species of spider wasps belonging to the family Pompilidae.

These wasps are also called tarantula hawks, as they usually hunt tarantulas, similarly to many species in the genus Hemipepsis.

Description
Body and legs are black with a weak blue-green-violet sheen. Antennae are black with orange apical segments. Wings may be amber to deep orange or dark brown or black with a blue-violet sheen.

Distribution
They are present in Argentina, Brazil, Bolivia, Paraguay, and Uruguay.

References

Pepsinae
Insects described in 1855
Hymenoptera of South America
Insects of Brazil
Insects of Bolivia
Insects of Uruguay
Arthropods of Argentina
Invertebrates of Paraguay